The Electoral Commission of Ghana(EC) is the official body in Ghana responsible for all public elections. Made up of seven members, its independence is guaranteed by the 1992 Ghana constitution. The current commission was established by the Electoral Commission Act (Act 451) of 1993.
Kwadwo Afari-Gyan was the first substantive chairman of the commission from 1993 to 2015. He was succeeded by Charlotte Osei as the first female chairman of the commission. On 5 December 2018, the Electoral commission chaired by Jean Adukwei Mensah reverted to the old logo showing Coat of arms of Ghana and a ballot box showing the hand casting its votes, after the controversy over the new logo

Members
The commission is made up of seven members. The position of chairman became vacant in June 2018 when the president, Nana Akufo-Addo sacked Charlotte Osei. This was apparently on the recommendation of a committee set up by Sophia Akuffo, the Chief Justice of Ghana. She was appointed by former President John Dramani Mahama, in consultation with the Council of State of Ghana in June 2015. Her two deputies were Amadu Sulley and Georgina Opoku Amankwah. Sulley Amadu was appointed by John Evans Atta Mills, the then Ghanaian President following the retirement of David Kangah who had served in that capacity for 19 years. Georgina Opoku Amankwah was appointed by President John Mahama to replace Sarfo-Kantanka who had served for about 20 years. She is the first female deputy chairman of the commission. There are four other members. Mrs. Paulina Adobea Dadzawa, an administrator and Ebenezer Aggrey Fynn, a Management Consultant were appointed by President Kufuor in consultation with the Council of State of Ghana in February 2004. In June 2018, the chairman, Charlotte Osei and her two deputies were sacked by Nana Akufo-Addo, President of Ghana following an investigation by a committee set up by the Chief Justice, Sophia Akuffo, following various allegations of fraud and corruption leveled against them. In July 2018,the President of Ghana, Nana Addo Dankwa Akuffo Addo nominated 4 EC top officials The new Electoral Commissioner, Jean Adukwei Mensa along with her two new deputies, Samuel Tettey and Eric Bossman as well as another new member Adwoa Asuama Abrefa were all sworn in by President Akufo-Addo on 1 August 2018.

International support

The claim that the commission received a successful support to the close of elections of 2008, has made it a focus of African and international election reform organizations. In November 2009, a conference was held to analyze this election and tried to establish new standards and practices for African election commissions which was Held in Accra was titled Colloquium on African Elections: Best Practices and Cross-Sectorial Collaboration. The conference was organized by a number of international election reform organizations including the National Democratic Institute, the Africa Center for Strategic Studies, the International Foundation for Electoral Systems, the Netherlands Institute for Multiparty Democracy, the Open Society Initiative for West Africa and UNDP.

Former members
In February 2004, three members of the commission retired. They were Elizabeth Solomon, Mrs. Theresa Cole and Professor Ernest Dumor. Another member, Dr. M. K.Puni, died in June 2005. Dixon Afreh is a former member of the Commission who left when he was appointed as a Justice of the Appeal Court in October 1994. Three of the members were appointed by President John Kufuor in consultation with the Council of State of Ghana in February 2004 and sworn in on 5 March 2004. They are Mrs. Paulina Adobea Dadzawa, an administrator, Nana Amba Eyiiba I, Efutuhemaa and Krontihemaa of the Oguaa Traditional Area and Eunice Akweley Roberts, an educationist and human resource practitioner. They were all women. Ebenezer Aggrey Fynn, a management consultant was also appointed to the commission by the president to bring it to its full complement of seven members.

In June 2018, the chairperson, Charlotte Osei, and her two deputies, Amadu Sulley and Georgina Opoku Amankwah were removed from office by President Akufo-Addo on the recommendation of a committee set up by the chief justice.

Elections
The Electoral Commission of Ghana established a biometric system of registration for the electoral register prior to the 2012 presidential and parliamentary elections to prevent double registration and to eliminate ghost names in the old register. In preparation towards the 2020 elections, 257 of the 260 offices all over the country were linked on the internet. MTN won the bid to provide the internet network and Persol Systems, the bid to build the Data Center. Two weeks before the 2020 elections, the commission indicated that it had put in place resources to ensure that the results and declaration of winners, would be done within 24 hours of the end of voting.

Preceding Institutions 
The lives of Electoral Commissions prior to the Fourth Republic of Ghana were interrupted due to military coups. At the time of the UNIGOV referendum in 1976, Justice Isaac K. Abban was appointed by the Supreme Military Council under Ignatius Kutu Acheampong. In 1979, Justice Joseph Kingsley-Nyinah was the Electoral Commissioner during the general election. For the Ghanaian presidential election and parliamentary election in 1992, the Electoral Commissioner was Justice Josiah Ofori Boateng.

Reform 
In May 2021, the EC agreed on some proposals to reform the conduct of elections in the country such as conduction of voter registration exercises all year round, exhibitions, filing of nominations and special voting.

See also
Elections in Ghana
List of Ghana Parliament constituencies
List of political parties in Ghana

References

External links
Official Website

Elections in Ghana
Politics of Ghana
Ghana
Organizations established in 1993
1993 establishments in Ghana